The 2013 European Beach Handball Championship was held in Randers, Denmark from 9–14 July. The men's competition was won by Croatia, while the women's tournament was won by Hungary.

Men's tournament

Preliminary round

Group A

Group B

Main round

Group I

Group II

Consolation round

Knockout stage

Championship bracket

5th-8th place

Final standings

Women's tournament

Preliminary round

Group A

Group B

Main round

Group I

Group II

Consolation round

Knockout stage

Championship bracket

5th-8th place

Final standings

References

External links
 Official site

European Beach Handball Championship
Beach Handball Championship
Beach Handball Championship
International handball competitions hosted by Denmark
2013 in Danish sport